In 1919 the Australian government offered a prize of £A10,000 for the first Australians in a British aircraft to fly from Great Britain to Australia. Of the six entries that started the race, the winners were pilot Ross Smith, his brother Keith Smith as co-pilot, and mechanics James Bennett and Wally Shiers, in a modified Vickers Vimy bomber.

The Competition
In early 1919, the Commonwealth Government of Australia offered a prize of £A10,000 for the first flight from Great Britain to Australia, under specific conditions. In May 1919, Billy Hughes, Prime Minister of Australia, and Senator George Pearce, Minister for Defence (Australia), in consultation with the Royal Aero Club, stated that valid aircrews must all be Australian nationals, the aircraft must have been constructed in the British Empire, and the journey must be completed within 720 consecutive hours (30 days) and be completed before midnight on 31 December 1920. The departure point must be either Hounslow Heath Aerodrome (for landplanes) or RNAS Calshot (for seaplanes and flying boats), with reporting points at Alexandria and Singapore, and final destination in the region of Darwin. Each flight was to take place under the competition rules of the Royal Aero Club, that would supervise the start, and control the competition generally.

Contestants

Sopwith Wallaby
At 11.44 a.m. on 21 October 1919, Captain George Campbell Matthews AFC as pilot, and Sergeant Thomas D. Kay as mechanic, took off from Hounslow Heath Aerodrome in a Sopwith Wallaby (G-EAKS). Bad weather caused delays at Cologne and Vienna, then they were imprisoned as suspected Bolsheviks in Yugoslavia, with further delays due to snow at Belgrade. A cracked engine cylinder at Constantinople, and bad weather at Aleppo caused more delays. Finally, on 17 April 1920, the Wallaby crashed on landing at Grokgak, on Bali. Matthews was slightly injured.

Vickers Vimy

Vickers entered a converted Vimy bomber (G-EAOU) (the registration being whimsically said to stand for "God 'elp all of us"), crewed by Captain Ross Macpherson Smith with his brother Lieutenant Keith Macpherson Smith as co-pilot and mechanics Sergeant W.H. (Wally) Shiers and Sergeant J.M. (Jim) Bennett. The Vimy left Hounslow Heath at 8.30 am on 12 November 1919. It flew via Lyon, Rome, Cairo, Damascus, Basra, Karachi, Delhi, Calcutta, Akyab, Rangoon racecourse, Singora (Songkhla) (in Siam unscheduled in heavy rain), Singapore, Batavia and Surabaya where the aircraft was bogged and had to make use of a temporary airstrip made from bamboo mats, reaching Darwin at 4.10pm on 10 December 1919. The flight distance was estimated as 17,911 kilometres (11,123 mi) and total flying time was 135 hours 55 minutes (131.8 km/h or 81.9 mph). The prize money was shared between the Smith brothers and the two mechanics. The Smith brothers each received a knighthood for this exploit, and the company presented their aircraft to the Australian government. It is now displayed at Adelaide Airport.

Alliance P.2
On 13 November 1919, Lieutenant Roger M. Douglas, MC DCM and Lieutenant J.S.L. Ross took off from Hounslow Heath in an Alliance P.2 Seabird (G-EAOX) named 'Endeavour'. It crashed in an orchard in Surbiton; Ross was killed outright, and Douglas died soon after of his injuries.

Blackburn Kangaroo
A team with a Blackburn Kangaroo (G-EAOW) had selected as navigator the Australian aviator Charles Kingsford Smith. Smith withdrew from the contest, and Captain Hubert Wilkins MC and bar took his place. On 21 November 1919, the Kangaroo took off from Hounslow Heath, piloted by Lieutenant V. Rendle with Captain Wilkins, Lieutenant D.R. Williams and Lieutenant Garnsey St. C. Potts as crew. Problems were experienced with the engines, and the plane was forced down over France. Repairs were made and the flight continued, still with engine problems. On 8 December 1919, the aircraft crash-landed at Suda Bay, Crete, ending up against the fence of a mental hospital. The crew escaped without injury.

Martinsyde Type A
On 5 December 1919, Captain Cedric E. Howell and Lieutenant George Henry Fraser left London in a Martinsyde Type A Mk.I (G-EAMR) aircraft. On 9 December, the aircraft disappeared near Corfu. The wreckage and Howell's body were found offshore, but Fraser's body was never found.

Airco DH.9
On 8 January 1920, Airco DH.9 (G-EAQM), piloted by Lieutenant Ray Parer, with co-pilot Lieutenant John C. McIntosh, took off from Hounslow Heath. The aircraft completed the flight, the first by a single-engined machine, in an epic 206 days later on  2 August 1920, earning Parer the sobriquet "Battling Ray". Although outside the time limit, the crew was awarded a consolation prize of £A1,000, second only to the Vimy. The DH.9 has been restored and placed on display at the Australian War Memorial at Canberra. The story is detailed in the book Flight and Adventures of Parer and McIntosh written by Emily Charnwood and first published in 1921. The machine is labelled PD after its sponsor, millionaire Peter Dawson, a whisky manufacturer, who financed the purchase of the machine and much of the journey. Ray Parer later took part in a similar journey, the MacRobertson Trophy Air Race in 1934.

See also 
 MacRobertson Air Race
See: Long Flight Home by Lanie Anderson (2019)

References

Bibliography

Jackson, A. J. 1973. British Civil Aircraft since 1919, Volume 2. Putnam . 
Lewis, Peter. 1970. British Racing and Record-Breaking Aircraft. Putnam  
Sherwood, Tim. 1999. Coming in to Land: A Short History of Hounslow, Hanworth and Heston Aerodromes 1911-1946. Heritage Publications (Hounslow Library)

External links 
Sir Ross and Sir Keith Smith, pioneer aviators, State Library of South Australia website including personal papers of Sir Ross and Sir Keith Smith
The Great Air Race, Northern Territory Library online feature
 Sir Ross Macpherson Smith bio with flight details on "Digger History"
 Articles on the flight from "The Age" newspaper
 Another article from seeingisbelieving.org.uk
 

Air races
England to Australia flight
20th century in Middlesex
History of the London Borough of Hounslow
History of Australia (1901–1945)
History of Darwin, Northern Territory
Australia–United Kingdom relations
England to Australia flight
England to Australia flight
20th century in Darwin, Northern Territory
1910s in the Northern Territory
Motorsport in the Northern Territory